Mahwi ( Mehwî; full name: مەلا موحەمەد کوڕی عوسمان بەڵخی Mala Mohammed Osman Ballkhi) (1830-1906) was one of the most prominent classical Kurdish poets and sufis from Kurdistan of Iraq. He studied in Sablakh and Sanandaj in Iranian Kurdistan. He became a judge in the court of Slemani, in today's Iraq, in 1862, which was then part of the Ottoman Empire. He travelled to Istanbul and met Abdul-Hamid II in 1883. He established a khaneqah, an Islamic religious school and mosque, in Slemani and named it after an Ottoman emperor. In his poems, he mainly promotes sufism, but also deals with the human condition and existential problems, such as questions about the meaning of life.

Works
A collection of his poems has been published several times.

Dîwanî Mehwî, Slemani, 1922.
Dîwanî Mehwî, Edited by Jamal Muhammad Muhammad Amin, Serkewtin Publishers, Sulaimaniya, 1984. 
Dîwanî Mehwî, Edited and Analyised by Mala Abdolkarimi Modarres and Mohammed Mala Karim, Hissam Publishers, Baghdad, 1977 and 1984.

External links
A collection of essays on Mahwi's poems (in Kurdish)  
Classical Traditions and Modern Meanings, by Stephen Sperl. Last visit 19 November 2013.

Iraqi Kurdish poets
1830 births
1906 deaths
19th-century poets of Ottoman Iraq